Big Brother 7 is a seventh season of various versions of Big Brother and may refer to:

 Gran Hermano (Spanish season 7), the 2005-2006 edition of the Spanish version
 Big Brother (British series 7), the 2006 edition of the UK reality television series Big Brother UK
 Big Brother 7 (American season), also known as Big Brother 7: All-Stars, the 2006 All-Stars edition of the U.S. version
 Big Brother (Australian season 7), the 2007 edition of the Australian version
 Big Brother Brasil 7, the 2007 edition of the Brazilian version
 Big Brother (German season 7), the 2007 edition of the German version
 Grande Fratello (season 7), the 2007 edition of the Italian version
 Big Brother (Finnish season 7), the 2011 edition of Big Brother in Finland
 Gran Hermano (Argentinian season 7), the 2011-2012 edition of the Argentinian Argentina
 Big Brother Africa (season 7), the 2012 edition of the African version
 Bigg Boss (Hindi season 7), the 2013 Indian version of famous original series Big Brother (British series 7)
 Secret Story (French season 7), the 2013 edition of Big Brother in France
 Big Brother Canada (season 7), the 2019 edition of Big Brother in Canada

See also
 Big Brother (franchise)
 Big Brother (disambiguation)